The Roosevelt School is a historic former school building on Maine State Route 161 in Saint John Plantation, Maine.  Built in 1920 to a standard plan and used as a school until 1969, it is the only surviving historic school building in the small rural community.  It was listed on the National Register of Historic Places in 1992.

Description and history
It is a single-story wood-frame structure, which is roughly rectangular in plan, with a projection extending across much of its front (north-facing) facade, and a small gable-roofed entry porch in front of that. The main block has a hip roof, which is continued over this projection, and there is a shed-roof dormer. The projecting section houses vestibules, closets, and bathroom facilities, and the main space is divided into two classrooms. The interior, despite alterations, retains significant elements of the original school function, including blackboards (now painted), and relatively unmodified closets and bathrooms. In some places original door and window trim is still in place, as is tongue-and-groove vertical wainscoting.

The school was built in 1920, to a plan that strongly resembles that of other rural Maine schools built around that time, and is the only school building known to survive from that period or earlier.  It was designed with two classrooms, later modified to have a movable divider.  It served as a school until 1969, and has most recently seen use as a private summer accommodation.

See also
National Register of Historic Places listings in Aroostook County, Maine

References

School buildings on the National Register of Historic Places in Maine
School buildings completed in 1920
Schools in Aroostook County, Maine
Colonial Revival architecture in Maine
National Register of Historic Places in Aroostook County, Maine
1920 establishments in Maine